There are many slums in Kenya, for example in the cities of Nairobi and Mombasa. According to UN DESA (United Nations Department of Economic and Social Affairs), 55 per cent of Kenya's urban population were slum inhabitants in 2007. In 2019, around two million inhabitants of Nairobi lived in informal settlements.

Nairobi
Dandora
Deep Sea
Huruma
Kangemi
Kariobangi
Kawangware
Kiambiu
Kiandutu
Kibera - including villages of Laini Saba, Lindi and Soweto East.
Korogocho
Kware
Majengo
Mathare - including settlements of Bondeni, Mathare 4A and Mathare 4B.
Matopeni
Mukuru kwa Njenga

Mombasa
 Magongo
 Majengo
 Mzambarauni

See also
 Squatting in Kenya

References

Slums
Kenya
Slums in Kenya
Shanty towns in Kenya
Squatting in Kenya